Sir John Burns Ure KCMG LVO FRGS (born 5 July 1931) is a retired British diplomat, ambassador to Cuba, Brazil and Sweden, and an author.

Career
John Ure was educated at Uppingham School. After active service as a 2nd Lieutenant with the Cameronians (Scottish Rifles) in Malaya, 1950–51, he read history at Magdalene College, Cambridge before joining the Foreign Service in 1956. Besides various posts at the Foreign Office he was 3rd Secretary (and private secretary to the Ambassador), Moscow, 1957–59; 2nd Secretary, Léopoldville, 1962–63; First Secretary (Commercial), Santiago, 1967–70; Counsellor, and intermittently Chargé d'Affaires, Lisbon, 1972–77; Ambassador to Cuba 1979–81; Ambassador to Brazil 1984–87 and Ambassador to Sweden 1987–91. During his career he attended the six-week Advanced Management Program at Harvard Business School.

After retiring from the Diplomatic Service, Sir John was a non-executive director of companies including Thomas Cook and Sotheby's Scandinavia, and served on the council of the Royal Geographical Society of which he is a Life Fellow.

John Ure was made LVO in 1968, CMG in 1980 and knighted KCMG in 1987. In 1973 he was made a Commander in the Portuguese Military Order of Christ.

In Who's Who, John Ure gives his recreation as "Travelling uncomfortably in remote places and writing about it comfortably afterwards."

Bibliography

Books
Cucumber Sandwiches in the Andes, Constable, London, 1973. 
Prince Henry the Navigator, Constable, London, 1977. 
The Trail of Tamerlane, Constable, London, 1980. 
The Quest for Captain Morgan, Constable, London, 1983. 
Trespassers on the Amazon, Constable, London, 1986. 
Royal Geographical Society History of World Exploration (Central and South America sections), Hamlyn, London, 1991. 
A Bird on the Wing: Bonnie Prince Charlie's Flight from Culloden Retraced, Constable, London, 1992. 
Diplomatic Bag: an Anthology of Diplomatic Incidents and Anecdotes from the Renaissance to the Gulf War (ed.), John Murray, London, 1994. 
The Cossacks, Constable, London, 1999. 
In Search of Nomads: an English Obsession from Hester Stanhope to Bruce Chatwin, Constable, London, 2003. 
Pilgrimage: the Great Adventure of the Middle Ages, Constable, London, 2006. 
contribution to The Seventy Great Journeys in History (ed. Robin Hanbury-Tenison), Thames & Hudson, London, 2006. 
Shooting Leave: Spying out Central Asia in the Great Game, Constable, London, 2009. 
contribution to The Great Explorers (ed. Robin Hanbury-Tenison), Thames & Hudson, London, 2010. 
Sabres on the Steppes: Danger, Diplomacy and Adventures in the Great Game, Constable, London, 2012.

Book reviews

References

John Ure at Little Brown, publishers
Sir John Ure – Speakers Agency
Tunisia's ancient history – The Daily Telegraph

1931 births
Living people
People educated at Uppingham School
Alumni of Magdalene College, Cambridge
British Army personnel of the Malayan Emergency
Cameronians officers
Ambassadors of the United Kingdom to Cuba
Ambassadors of the United Kingdom to Brazil
Ambassadors of the United Kingdom to Sweden
British writers
Fellows of the Royal Geographical Society
Lieutenants of the Royal Victorian Order
Knights Commander of the Order of St Michael and St George
Commanders of the Order of Christ (Portugal)
20th-century diplomats
Country Life (magazine) people
Alumni of Magdalen College, Oxford